Littorina fabalis is a species of sea snail, a marine gastropod mollusk in the family Littorinidae, the winkles or periwinkles.

Description 
The maximum recorded shell length is 1.8 cm. L. fabalis can be dark or light green, yellow, orange, brown or black. The lighter colours are more frequently found on sheltered shores, and the brown morph on exposed shores.

Distribution 
L. fabalis is distributed on British, Irish, and North Sea coasts, and southwards into the western Mediterranean.

Habitat 
This species can be found on seaweeds like Fucus vesiculosus and Ascophyllum nodosum. The minimum recorded depth for this species is 0 m; maximum recorded depth is 0 m.

References

Littorinidae
Gastropods described in 1825
Taxa named by William Turton